Thian Hee or Thianhee Sarasin was also known by his noble title Phraya Sarasinsawamiphak. Thian Hee (1848–1925) was born in Thailand to a Chinese father. He came from a line of wealthy rice traders and pharmacists who had immigrated from Hainan Province, China to reside in the largely mercantile Thonburi across the river from Bangkok. At a young age he was taken to the US by a missionary to pursue his studies. He is noted as being the first Thai to have studied in the US. He finished his studies in medicine at Columbia University in 1871. He returned to Thailand as the country's first ever medical doctor.

He became a prominent military doctor and accompanied the army on expeditions to Laos under Chao Phraya Surasakdi Montri during the Haw Wars of 1865-1890. Malaria proved to be a more formidable foe than the Haw and Thian Hee was largely occupied with administering quinine to afflicted troops. A photograph now on view at Vimanmek Mansion depicts Thian Hee handing the last bottle of quinine to the commanding general to prove the scarcity of their supplies. Among his activities in Laos as part of an occupational force was the imposition of a partially successful ban on the practice of using witch doctors and witchcraft to heal the local populace of illnesses.

Thian Hee later returned to his family profession as a rice trader and became one of the country's most influential merchants. He acted as a financial advisor to Queen Savang Vadhana, often serving as intermediary between the palace and the largely insular Chinese merchant community. He amassed wealth as a co-founder of Siam Cement, a conglomerate now the second largest company in Thailand. As an act of gratitude to the missionary who had supported him as a child, Thian Hee funded the construction of Thailand's fourth Presbyterian church, Suebsamphanthawong Church, in 1902 on his own plot of land in Si Lom. In 1925, following his death, he was interred next to the church in a mausoleum in the family cemetery.

Thian Hee was the founder of the illustrious Sarasin family. He was the father of Pote Sarasin who became the first secretary general of SEATO and the ninth prime minister of Thailand.

Thian Hee's official title was Phraya Sarasinsawamiphakh. The title "phraya" is now obsolete. It was the second highest feudal title a person could be given and is the equivalent of "marquis" in the West.

References

Further reading

Thian Hee Sarasin
Columbia University Vagelos College of Physicians and Surgeons alumni
Thian Hee Sarasin
Thian Hee Sarasin
Converts to Protestantism from Buddhism
1848 births
1925 deaths